Honesdale High School is a public, four-year, regional high school serving grades 9–12 in Honesdale, Wayne County, Pennsylvania, United States, as a part of the Wayne Highlands School District. In the 2017–2018 school year, the School reported an enrollment of 838 pupils in grades 9th through 12th.
 
In 1813 the Honesdale Academy which was a private preparatory school and the
forerunner of the Honesdale High School, was founded. In 1875, the first class was graduated
from a public high school in Honesdale. Honesdale’s first modern building constructed for
school purposes was opened in 1909. In 1924, the consolidation of six political subdivisions
formed the first union school district in Pennsylvania. On April 6, 1959 the present high
school building was constructed. In 1970, under the School District Reorganization Act, the
district was again expanded. The new name became the Wayne Highlands School District.

Honesdale High School is an accredited member of the Middle States Association of Colleges and Schools since 1940. The school is also accredited by the Pennsylvania Department of Education.

Extracurriculars
Wayne Highlands School District offers a variety of clubs, activities and an extensive sports program.

Sports
The District funds:

Boys
Baseball - AAA
Basketball- AAA
Cross Country - AA
Football - AAA
Golf - AAA
Soccer - AA
Tennis - AA
Track and Field - AAA
Wrestling - AAA

Girls
Basketball - AAA
Cross Country - AA
Field Hockey - AAA
Soccer (Fall) - AA
Softball - AAA
Girls' Tennis - AA
Track and Field - AAA

Honesdale High School has a long history of athletic success, most notably in cross-country, wrestling, track and field, golf, and more recently boys and girls soccer. Honesdale High School football has had a notable decline in the past years and is facing their third losing season in a row.

Notable staff and alumni
 Lyman Louis Lemnitzer, class of 1917, was a former Chairman of the Joint Chiefs of Staff.
 Art Wall, Jr., golfer and 1959 Masters Tournament champion was born and lived in Honesdale.
 Richard J. Tallman, class of 1943, was a U.S. Army Brigadier General killed in action in Vietnam in 1972

See also
Honesdale, Pennsylvania
List of high schools in Pennsylvania

References

External links
Official website
Historic Honesdale

Public high schools in Pennsylvania
Schools in Wayne County, Pennsylvania
1959 establishments in Pennsylvania
Educational institutions established in 1959